Hadennia is a genus of moths of the family Erebidae. The genus was erected by Frederic Moore in 1885.

Species
Hadennia angustifascia Holloway, 2008 Borneo, Sumatra, Java
Hadennia emmelodes (Bethune-Baker, 1908) New Guinea
Hadennia harmani Holloway, 2008 Borneo, Peninsular Malaysia
Hadennia hisbonalis (Walker, [1859]) north-eastern Hiamalayas, Taiwan, Peninsular Malaysia, Sumatra, Borneo
Hadennia hypenalis (Walker, [1859]) India, Sri Lanka, Taiwan, Peninsular Malaysia, Sumatra, Borneo
Hadennia incompleta (Prout, 1928) Borneo, Thailand
Hadennia incongruens (Butler, 1878) Japan, Korea, south-eastern Siberia
Hadennia jutalis (Walker, [1859]) Sri Lanka, Myanmar, Andaman Islands
Hadennia kimae Holloway, 2008 Borneo
Hadennia maculifascia (Hampson, 1895) Myanmar, Thailand, Peninsular Malaysia, Singapore, Java, Borneo
Hadennia mysalis (Walker, 1859) Sri Lanka, Japan, Taiwan, Myanmar, Thailand, Andamans, Borneo
Hadennia nakatanii Owada, 1979 Japan
Hadennia nigerrima (C. Swinhoe, 1918) Nias, Borneo, Thailand
Hadennia obliqua (Wileman, 1911) Japan
Hadennia ochreistigma (Hampson, 1895) Myanmar
Hadennia pallifascia Holloway, 1976 Borneo
Hadennia purifascia Prout, 1932 Sumatra
Hadennia subapicibrunnea Holloway, 1976 Borneo, Buru
Hadennia suttoni Holloway, 2008 Borneo
Hadennia transvestita Holloway, 2008 Borneo

References

Herminiinae